South Africa competed at the 2013 World Aquatics Championships in Barcelona, Spain between 19 July and 4 August 2013.

Medalists

Diving

South Africa qualified four quota places for the following diving events.

Men

Women

Open water swimming

South Africa qualified six quotas for the following events in open water swimming.

Men

Women

Mixed

Swimming

South African swimmers achieved qualifying standards in the following events (up to a maximum of 2 swimmers in each event at the A-standard entry time, and 1 at the B-standard):

Men

Women

Synchronized swimming

South Africa has qualified the following synchronized swimmers.

Water polo

Men's tournament

Team roster

Dwayne Flatscher
Etienne Le Roux
Devon Card
Ignardus Badenhorst
Nicholas Rodda
Jason Kyte
Richard Downes
Ryan Bell
Dean Whyte
Pierre Le Roux
Nicholas Molyneux
Adam Kajee
Donn Stewart

Group play

Round of 16

Women's tournament

Team roster

Anke Jacobs
Kimberly Schmidt
Kieran Paley
Christy Rawstron
Megan Schooling
Tarryn Schooling
Kimberly Kay
Lee-Anne Keet
Delaine Christian
Marcelle Keet
Lindsay Killeen
Kelsey White
Thembelihle Mkize

Group play

Round of 16

References

External links
Barcelona 2013 Official Site
Swimming South Africa

Nations at the 2013 World Aquatics Championships
2013
World Aquatics Championships